Minsontaung Wildlife Sanctuary is a protected area in Myanmar, covering . It was established in 2001.

As Minsontaung Wildlife Sanctuary is located in the rain shadow of the Arakan Mountains, it harbours dry forest dominated by Acacia catechu, Acacia leucophloea, Acacia arabica, Tectona hamiltoniana and Terminalia oliveri. Grasses such as Diectomis fastigata and Apluda mutica grow in open areas. The sanctuary provides habitat to the Burmese star tortoise (Geochelone platynota), which is endemic to Myanmar's dry zone.

References

Protected areas of Myanmar
Protected areas established in 2001